The Catholic Church in Uruguay is part of the worldwide Catholic Church, under the spiritual leadership of the Pope in Rome.

Overview 

In 2014, Catholics made up a minority of the population at 38%, second to the unaffiliated group, which came in at 41%.

There are 9 dioceses and the archdiocese of Montevideo; the ordinaries gather in the Episcopal Conference of Uruguay. The current archbishop is Daniel Sturla, who was appointed on 11 February 2014.

The patron saint of Uruguay is Our Lady of the Thirty-Three, venerated at the Cathedral Basilica of Florida.

History 
Evangelization of Uruguay followed Spanish settlement in 1624. Montevideo became a diocese in 1878, after being erected as a Vicarate in 1830. Missionaries followed the reduction pattern of gathering Indians into communities, training them in agriculture, husbandry, and other arts, while forming them in the Faith.

The constitution of 1830 made Catholicism the religion of the state and subsidized missions to Indians. In 1878, Montevideo was elevated to Diocese and, in 1897, to Archdiocese.

The constitution of 1917 enacted separation of Church and state.

Two Eastern Catholic churches are also present in Uruguay, the Armenian Catholic Church and the Maronite Church.

Careers
Uruguay is a country where religious calling is low. Every year, some young people engage in religious careers. In 2013, there were 34 students at the Archdiocesan Seminary in Montevideo.

Saints

So far, there are not any Uruguayan saints, but several causes are open:
 Servant of God Jacinto Vera
 Servant of God Rubén Isidro Alonso
 Servant of God Walter Chango
 Servant of God Salvador García Pintos
 Blessed Francesca Rubatto
 Blessed Consuelo Aguiar-Mella y Díaz
 Blessed Dolores Aguiar-Mella y Díaz

Institutes of Consecrated Life
Several religious orders are present in Uruguay. Some of them arrived in colonial times (although their presence was intermittent during the first centuries):
Franciscans (O.F.M.Cap.), since 1624
Dominicans (O.P.), since 1660
Society of Jesus (S.J.), 1680–1757, 1842-1859 and since 1872
After Uruguay was established as an independent country, several other religious orders established their own missions in Uruguay:
Conventual Franciscans (O.F.M.Conv.)
Betharram Fathers, known also as "Padres Bayoneses" (S.C.I. di Béth.), since 1856
Salesians of Don Bosco (S.D.B.), since 1877
Sisters of Adoration (R.A.), known also as "Adoratrices", since 1885
Sisters of Christian Charity, known also as "Hermanas Alemanas" (S.C.C.), since 1885
Pallottine Fathers (S.A.C.), since 1886
Brothers of the Holy Family of Belley (F.S.F.), since 1889
Vincentians (C.M.), since 1892
Capuchin Sisters of Mother Rubatto (S.C.M.R.), since 1892
Claretians (C.M.F.), since 1896
Oblates of St. Francis de Sales (O.S.F.S.), since 1896
Discalced Carmelites (O.C.D.), since 1912
Dominican Sisters of the Annunciation of the Blessed Virgin, or simply "Dominicas" (D.A.), since 1913
Sons of Divine Providence (F.D.P.), since 1921
Maronite Order of the Blessed Virgin Mary (O.M.M.), since 1924
Missionary Oblates of Mary Immaculate (O.M.I.), since 1929.
Augustinians (O.S.A.), since 1932
Marist Brothers (F.M.S.), since 1934
Brothers of the Sacred Heart, known also as "Corazonistas" (S.C.), since 1935
Dehonians (S.C.I.), since 1940
Passionists (C.P.), since 1940
Brothers of Christian Instruction (F.I.C.P.), known also as "Menesianos", since 1951
Religious of Jesus and Mary (R.J.M.), since 1952
Christian Brothers (C.F.C.), since 1955
Opus Dei, since 1956
Sisters Hospitaller of the Sacred Heart of Jesus (H.S.C.), since 1961
Scalabrinians (C.S.), since 1970
Missionaries of Charity (M.C.), since 1991
Visitandines (V.S.M.)
Brothers of Our Lady of Mercy, known as "Misericordistas" (F.D.M.)
Poor Servants of Divine Providence (P.S.D.P.)
Salesian Sisters of Don Bosco (F.M.A.)

Notable Uruguayan Catholic religious leaders
 Dámaso Antonio Larrañaga (1771–1848), naturalist and first Apostolic Vicar of Uruguay 
 Juan Francisco Larrobla (1775–1842), theologian and patriot, writer of the Declaration of the Independence
 José Benito Monterroso (1780–1838), secretary of the national hero José Artigas
 José Benito Lamas (1787–1857), patriot and lecturer
 Manuel Barreiro (1787–1838), patriot and constituent
 Lorenzo Antonio Fernández (1792–1852), constituent and rector of the University
 Servant of God Jacinto Vera (1813–1881), first Bishop of Montevideo
 Blessed Francisca Rubatto (1844–1905), founder of the Capuchin Sisters of Mother Rubatto
 Mariano Soler (1846–1908), first Archbishop of Montevideo
 Antonio Barbieri, OFM Cap (1892–1979), first Uruguayan cardinal
 Juan Luis Segundo, S.J. (1925–1996), liberation theologian
 Servant of God Rubén Isidro Alonso, S.D.B. (1929-1992), streetwise priest
 Daniel Sturla, S.D.B. (born 1959), second Uruguayan cardinal and current archbishop of Montevideo
 Gonzalo Aemilius (born 1978), principal of the Liceo Jubilar

See also

Episcopal Conference of Uruguay
List of Catholic dioceses in Uruguay
List of Uruguayan Catholic priests

References

External links

Episcopal Conference of Uruguay 

 
Uruguay
Uruguay